Lin Kuang-liang (born 15 September 1969) is a Taiwanese sprinter. He competed in the men's 400 metres at the 1988 Summer Olympics.

References

1969 births
Living people
Athletes (track and field) at the 1988 Summer Olympics
Taiwanese male sprinters
Taiwanese male middle-distance runners
Olympic athletes of Taiwan
Place of birth missing (living people)